Prescott Sheldon Bush (May 15, 1895 – October 8, 1972) was an American banker   as a Wall Street executive investment banker, he represented Connecticut in the  from 1952   of the Bush family, he was the father of President , and the paternal grandfather of President  and Florida Governor 

Born in Columbus, Ohio, Bush graduated from Yale College and served as an artillery officer during World War I. After the war, he worked for several companies, becoming a minor partner of the A. Harriman & Co. investment bank in 1931. He served in several high-ranking United States Golf Association offices, including president of that organization. Bush settled in Connecticut in 1925.

Bush won election to the Senate in a 1952 special election, narrowly defeating Democratic nominee Abraham Ribicoff. In the Senate, Bush staunchly supported President Dwight D. Eisenhower and helped enact legislation to create the Interstate Highway System. Bush won re-election in 1956 but declined to seek re-election in 1962, retiring from the Senate the following year.

Early life
Bush was born in Columbus, Ohio, to Samuel Prescott Bush and Flora Sheldon Bush. Samuel Bush was a railroad middle manager, then a steel company president and, during World War I, also a federal government official in charge of coordination of and assistance to major weapons contractors.

Bush attended St. George's School in Middletown, Rhode Island, from 1908–1913. In 1913, he enrolled at Yale College, where his paternal grandfather, Rev. James Smith Bush (class of 1844), and his maternal uncle Robert E. Sheldon Jr. (class of 1904) had matriculated.  Three subsequent generations of the Bush family have been Yale alumni. Prescott Bush was admitted to the Zeta Psi fraternity and Skull and Bones secret society. George H. W. Bush was also a member of the society, as is his son, George W. Bush.  George H. W. Bush and George Bush were, however, not members of Zeta Psi, and were members, instead, of the Delta Kappa Epsilon fraternity.

According to Skull and Bones lore, Prescott Bush was among a group of Bonesmen who dug up and removed the skull of Geronimo from his grave at Fort Sill, Oklahoma, in 1918. According to historian David L. Miller, the Bonesmen probably dug up somebody at Fort Sill, but not Geronimo.

Prescott Bush was a cheerleader, played varsity golf 
and baseball, and was president of the Yale Glee Club.

After graduation, Bush served as a field artillery captain with the American Expeditionary Forces (1917–1919) during World War I. He received intelligence training at Verdun, France, and was briefly assigned to a staff of French officers. Alternating between intelligence and artillery, he came under fire in the Meuse-Argonne offensive.

Business career
After his discharge in 1919, Prescott Bush went to work for the Simmons Hardware Company in St. Louis, Missouri.

The Bush family moved to Columbus, Ohio, in 1923, where Prescott briefly worked for the Hupp Products Company. In November 1923, he became president of sales for Stedman Products in South Braintree, Massachusetts. During this time, he lived in a Victorian house at 173 Adams Street in Milton, Massachusetts, where his son, George H. W. Bush, was born.

In 1924, Bush became vice-president of the investment bank A. Harriman & Co. where his father-in-law, George Herbert Walker was president. Bush's Yale classmates and fellow Bonesmen E. Roland Harriman and Knight Woolley also worked with the company.

In 1925, he joined the United States Rubber Company of New York City as manager of the foreign division, and moved to Greenwich, Connecticut.

In 1931, he became a partner of Brown Brothers Harriman & Co., which was created through the 1931 amalgamation of A. Harriman & Co with Brown Bros. & Co., (a merchant bank founded in Philadelphia in 1818) and with Harriman Brothers & Co. (established in New York City in 1927).

He was an avid golfer, and in 1935 was named head of the USGA.

From 1944–1956, Prescott Bush was a member of the Yale Corporation, the principal governing body of Yale University. He was on the board of directors of CBS, having been introduced to chairman William S. Paley around 1932 by his close friend and colleague W. Averell Harriman, who became a major Democratic Party power broker.

Business Plot or Union Banking Corporation 
In July 2007, Harper's Magazine published an article by Scott Horton, an American attorney known for his work in human rights law and the law of armed conflict, claiming that Prescott Bush was involved in the 1934 Business Plot, a failed plan by some of America's wealthy to trick Retired Marine Corps Major General Smedley Butler into helping them overthrow President Franklin D. Roosevelt.

Bush was a founder and one of seven directors (including W. Averell Harriman) of the Union Banking Corporation (holding a single share out of 4,000 as a director), an investment bank that operated as a clearing house for many assets and enterprises held by German steel magnate Fritz Thyssen, an early supporter and financier of the Nazi Party. In July 1942, the bank was suspected of holding gold on behalf of Nazi leaders. A subsequent government investigation disproved those allegations but confirmed the Thyssens' control, and in October 1942 the United States seized the bank under the Trading with the Enemy Act and held the assets for the duration of World War II. 

Journalist Duncan Campbell pointed out documents showing that Prescott Bush was a director and shareholder of a number of companies involved with Thyssen. Bush was the director of the Union Banking Corporation that "represented Thyssen's US interests", continuing to work for the bank after America's entry into World War II.

Political life
Prescott Bush was politically active on social issues. He was involved with the American Birth Control League as early as 1942, and served as the treasurer of the first nationwide campaign of Planned Parenthood in 1947. He was also an early supporter of the United Negro College Fund, serving as chairman of the Connecticut branch in 1951.

From 1947–1950, he served as Connecticut Republican finance chairman, and was the Republican candidate for the United States Senate in 1950. A columnist in Boston said that Bush "is coming on to be known as President Truman's Harry Hopkins. Nobody knows Mr. Bush and he hasn't a Chinaman's chance." (Harry Hopkins had been one of Franklin D. Roosevelt's closest advisors.) Bush's ties with Planned Parenthood also hurt him in strongly-Catholic Connecticut, and were the basis of a last-minute campaign in churches by Bush's opponents; the family vigorously denied the connection, but Bush lost to Sen. William Burnett Benton by only 1,000 votes.

Prescott Bush sought a rematch with Sen. Benton in 1952, but withdrew as the party turned to William Purtell. The death of Senator Brien McMahon later that year, however, created a vacancy and this time the Republicans  He defeated the Democratic nominee, Abraham Ribicoff, and was elected to the Senate. A staunch supporter of President Dwight D. Eisenhower, he served until January 1963. He was re-elected in 1956 with 55% of the vote over Democrat Thomas J. Dodd (later U.S. Senator from Connecticut and father of Christopher J. Dodd), and decided not to run for another term in 1962. He was a key ally for the passage of Eisenhower's Interstate Highway System, and during his tenure supported the Polaris submarine project (built by Electric Boat Corporation in Groton, Connecticut), the establishment of the Peace Corps, and voted in favor of the Civil Rights Acts of 1957 and 1960 and the 24th Amendment to the U.S. Constitution.

On December 2, 1954, Prescott Bush was part of the large (67–22) majority to censure Wisconsin Republican Senator Joseph McCarthy after McCarthy had taken on the U.S. Army and the Eisenhower administration. During the debate leading to the censure, Bush said that McCarthy has "caused dangerous divisions among the American people because of his attitude and the attitude he has encouraged among his followers: that there can be no honest differences of opinion with him. Either you must follow Senator McCarthy blindly, not daring to express any doubts or disagreements about any of his actions, or, in his eyes, you must be a Communist, a Communist sympathizer, or a fool who has been duped by the Communist line." Eisenhower later included Prescott Bush on an undated handwritten list of prospective candidates he favored for the 1960 Republican presidential nomination.

In terms of issues, Bush often agreed with New York Governor Nelson Rockefeller. According to Theodore H. White's book about the 1964 presidential election, Bush and Rockefeller were longtime friends. Bush favored a Nixon-Rockefeller ticket for 1960, and was presumed to support Rockefeller's 1964 presidential candidacy until the latter's remarriage in 1963. He then publicly denounced Rockefeller for divorcing his first wife and marrying a woman with whom Rockefeller had been having an affair while married to his first wife. Bush then very publicly endorsed his former Senate colleague Henry Cabot Lodge Jr., who was also the older brother of one of Bush's protegés, former Connecticut Governor John Davis Lodge.

Another of Senator Bush's major legislative interests was flood and hurricane protection.  He drafted the Bush Hurricane Survey Act (Public Law 71), enabling U.S. Army engineers to develop a new program of community protection against tidal flooding. Bush and Representative John W. McCormack, the Democratic House Majority Leader, co-sponsored the Bush-McCormack Act (Public Law 685), which expedited the construction of local flood protection works.

Personal life

Prescott Bush married Dorothy Wear Walker (1901–1992) on August 6, 1921, in Kennebunkport, Maine. Dorothy Walker Bush was a founding member of the Junior League of Columbus, Ohio in 1923. They had five children:   George  Nancy  Jonathan  and William "Bucky" 

Bush founded the Yale Glee Club Associates, an alumni group, in 1937. As was his father-in-law, he was a member of the United States Golf Association, serving successively as secretary, vice-president and president, 1928–1935. He was a multi-year club champion of the Round Hill Club in Greenwich, Connecticut, and was on the committee set up by New York City Mayor Robert F. Wagner Jr. to help create the New York Mets.

He was a member of the American Legion and the 40 & 8 Society.

Bush maintained homes in New York City, Long Island, Greenwich, the Walker's Point Estate, and Fishers Island, a secluded island off the Connecticut coast.

Writings
Bush's articles include:
 "Timely Monetary Policy," Banking, June 1955 and July 1955
 "To Preserve Peace Let's Show the Russians How Strong We Are!" Reader's Digest, July 1959
 "Politics Is Your Business," Chamber of Commerce, State of New York, Bulletin, May 1960

See also
 List of members of the American Legion

References

Further reading
 The Prescott Bush Papers are at the University of Connecticut, Storrs.
 The Greenwich Library Oral History Project has interviews with Prescott Bush Jr. and Mary Walker.
 There is material by and about Bush in the History of the Class of 1917 Yale College (1919) and the supplementary class albums.
 John Atlee Kouwenhoven, Partners in Banking: An Historical Portrait of a Great Private Bank, Brown Brothers Harriman (1968).
 Obituaries are in the Washington Post, October 9, 1972; the New York Times, October 9, 1972; the Hartford Courant, October 9, 1972; and Yale Alumni Magazine, December 1972.
 Prescott Sheldon Bush. Dictionary of American Biography, Supplement 9: 1971–1975. Charles Scribner's Sons, 1994.
 Darwin Payne, Initiative in Energy: Dresser Industries, Inc., 1880–1978. New York: Simon and Schuster (1979).

External links

University of Connecticut's profile of Prescott Bush

|-

1895 births
1972 deaths
American bankers
American chief executives of financial services companies
American Episcopalians
United States Army personnel of World War I
American birth control activists
Bush family
Businesspeople from Massachusetts
Businesspeople from Columbus, Ohio
Deaths from lung cancer in New York (state)
Connecticut Republicans
Politicians from Braintree, Massachusetts
Politicians from Columbus, Ohio
Businesspeople from Greenwich, Connecticut
People from Milton, Massachusetts
Republican Party United States senators from Connecticut
United States Army officers
Yale Bulldogs football players
Brown Brothers Harriman & Co. people
Military personnel from Connecticut
St. George's School (Rhode Island) alumni
Fathers of presidents of the United States
Fathers of vice presidents of the United States
20th-century American politicians
Yale College alumni